Peter Kay's Comedy Shuffle is a BBC comedy series produced by Goodnight Vienna Productions featuring clips taken from various television appearances of Peter Kay. It is broadcast on BBC One. A fourth series began on 27 March 2020.

Episodes

Series 1 (2016)

Series 2 (2017)

Series 3 (2018)

Series 4 (2020)

Peter Kay's Stand-Up Comedy Shuffle (2020)

Home media 
The series "Comedy Shuffle" hasn't been released on DVD, since the BBC turned it down in April 2016, and they stated "it was due to the fact that all of Kay's old tat is already available to buy". However, a compilation DVD entitled "Peter Kay's Special Kay" was released on 17 November 2008.

References

External links 
 
 

2016 British television series debuts
2020 British television series endings
2010s British comedy television series
2020s British comedy television series
BBC high definition shows
BBC television comedy
English-language television shows